2016 (January) Patna Pirates season contains information about an Indian Kabbadi team and its games in 2016.

Season 3 Performance

References

Patna Pirates